Joseph Brahim Seid (1927 in N'Djamena – 1980) was a Chadian writer and politician. He served as Minister of Justice from 1966 to 1975. As a writer he is known for the works Au Tchad sous les étoiles ("In Chad under the stars", 1962) and Un enfant du Tchad ("A Child of Chad", 1967), based on his own life.

See also 
 List of Chadians
 List of African writers

References
 Chad - Arts and Literature
 L'Action nationale 

1927 births
1980 deaths
Chadian writers
Government ministers of Chad
People from N'Djamena